Virtual art is a term for the virtualization of art, made with the technical media developed at the end of the 1980s (or a bit before, in some cases). These include human-machine interfaces such as visualization casks, stereoscopic spectacles and screens, digital painting and sculpture, generators of three-dimensional sound, data gloves, data clothes, position sensors, tactile and power feed-back systems, etc. As virtual art covers such a wide array of mediums it is a catch-all term for specific focuses within it. Much contemporary art has become, in Frank Popper's terms, virtualized.

Definition
Virtual art can be considered a post-convergent art form based on the bringing together of art and technology, thus containing all previous media as subsets. Sharing this focus on art and technology are the books of Jack Burnham (Beyond Modern Sculpture 1968) and Gene Youngblood (Expanded Cinema 1970). Since virtual art can consist of virtual reality, augmented reality, or mixed reality, it can be seen in other aspects of production such as video games and movies.

In his book, From Technological to Virtual Art, Frank Popper traces the development of immersive, interactive new media art from its historical antecedents through today's digital art, computer art, cybernetic art, multimedia art, and net art. Popper shows that contemporary virtual art is a further refinement of the technological art of the late twentieth century and also a departure from it. What is new about this new media art, he argues, is its humanization of technology, its emphasis on interactivity, its philosophical investigation of the real and the virtual, and its multisensory nature. He argues further that what distinguishes the artists who practice virtual art from traditional artists is their combined commitment to aesthetics and technology. Their "extra-artistic" goals – linked to their aesthetic intentions – concern not only science and society but also basic human needs and drives.

To explain and illustrate the emergence of a techno-aesthetic, Popper stresses the panoramic and multi-generational reach of virtual art. As regards to virtual art, openness is stressed both from the point of view of the artists and their creativity and from that of the follow-up users in their reciprocating thoughts and actions. This commitment to the teeming openness found in virtual art can be traced to the theories of Umberto Eco and other aestheticians.

In virtual worlds and entertainment
Virtual art can be seen in worlds like Second Life, and Inworldz virtual environments in which anything is possible to the user, who is represented by an avatar. In the virtual world, the avatar's abilities ranges from ordinary walking to flying. The environment and scenery of such environments is similar to the real world, except that it can be altered by the avatar. Worlds like Inworldz and Second Life feature an editor which allows the user to build his or her own experience just the way he or she wants it to be. The user is not bounded by physics or improbabilities that he or she faces in the real world.

Virtual art is made with many computer programs and has no boundaries, so it uses animations, movies, computer games and so on. As it becomes more and more popular and important, it results in people being able to live another virtual life. With the advancements in technology, virtual art has transformed and evolved quickly from simple 8-bit representations to 3D models containing millions of polygons.

In popular video games and movies
 Final Fantasy
 The Sims
 Heavy Rain
 Metal Gear Solid
 The Matrix
 Terminator
 Avatar
 The Elder Scrolls
 Ready Player One

Notable artists

See also
 Virtualization
 Visual arts

Notes

Bibliography
 Grau Oliver, Digital Art through the Looking Glass: New strategies for archiving, collecting and preserving in Digital Humanities. Edition Donau-Universität, Krems an der Donau, 2019 
Grau Oliver, Museum and Archive on the Move - Changing Cultural Institutions on the Digital Era. DE GRUYTER, Berlin, 2017 
 Jesús Muñoz Morcillo, Florian Faion, Antonio Zea, Uwe D. Hanebeck, Caroline Y. Robertson-von Trotha, "e-Installation – Synesthetic Documentation of Media Art via Telepresence Technologies." In: Maria Boştenaru Dan, Cerasella Crăciun (eds.): Space and Time Visualisation. Springer International Publishing 2016, pp. 173-191. 
Frank Popper, From Technological to Virtual Art, Leonardo Books, MIT Press, 2007
 Charlie Gere, Art, Time and Technology: Histories of the Disappearing Body (2005) Berg, p. 146
 Christiane Paul, Digital Art, Thames & Hudson Ltd. p. 219
 Joseph Nechvatal, "Frank Popper and Virtualised Art", Tema Celeste Magazine: Winter 2004 issue #101, pp. 48–53
 Origins of Virtualism: An Interview with Frank Popper conducted by Joseph Nechvatal", CAA Art Journal, Spring 2004, pp. 62-77
 Lieser, Wolf. Digital Art. Langenscheidt: h.f. ullmann. 2009 p. 283
Frank Popper, Art—Action and Participation, New York University Press, 1975
Sandrine Baranski, La musique en réseau, une musique de la complexité ?, Éditions universitaires européennes, mai 2010
Oliver Grau (2003). Virtual Art: From Illusion to Immersion (MIT Press/Leonardo Books). Cambridge, Massachusetts: The MIT Press. .
 Frank Popper, Art of the Electronic Age'', Thames & Hudson, 1997

External links
 Virtual Art and Artists Bibliography

Visual arts media
Contemporary art
Virtual reality